Joan Meakin (7 January 1910 – 11 November 1977 born Marjorie Joan) became the first female glider pilot to fly over the English Channel on 5 April 1934. She was also the only female flyer in Sir Alan Cobham's Flying Circus.

She married Ronald Price who was the assistant general manager to the circus.

References

1910 births
1977 deaths
English aviators
Gliding in England
Glider pilots
British women aviators
British flight instructors